Isis River, a perennial river of the Hunter River catchment, is located in the Upper Hunter region of New South Wales, Australia.

Course and features
Isis River rises on the southern slopes of the Great Dividing Range, below Crawney Mountain, northeast of Murrurundi and flows generally south, joined by two minor tributaries before reaching its confluence with the Pages River near Belltrees, northeast of Scone. The river descends  over its  course.

See also

 Rivers of New South Wales
 List of rivers of New South Wales (A–K)
 List of rivers of Australia

References

External links
 

 

Rivers of the Hunter Region
Upper Hunter Shire
Hunter River (New South Wales)